Corner Theatre E.T.C. (Corner Theatre) was an experimental theater located in Baltimore, Maryland, existing from 1968 to 1987 as a nonprofit cultural organization.

The theater provided resources for new playwrights, designers, directors, actors, dancers, and other artists seeking experimental avenues for self-expression and social and political commentary. Throughout its nineteen-year existence, Corner Theatre was dedicated to presenting new and original plays, while encouraging a confrontational approach to production.

The first year: 1968
The Corner Theatre Experimental Theatre Club (Corner Theatre E.T.C.) was created following a Monday night lecture given by New York City's La MaMa Experimental Theatre Club founder and artistic director Ellen Stewart at Center Stage, an Equity theatre in Baltimore. Stewart's lecture challenged those in attendance to create a Baltimore version of her East Village-based experimental theatre. Local producer and director Leslie Irons subsequently met with Stewart and was granted La MaMa's repertoire of original plays. Irons then assembled a group of artists who shared his interest in the creation of a new, radical performing arts center, including: Cliff Pottberg, Mac Lang, Marie Stewart, Daniel Inglett, and Joe Harris. Funds were quickly raised, and Corner Theatre ETC opened at 853 North Howard Street with their inaugural production, an evening of two one-act plays: Birdbath by New York playwright Leonard Melfi and Baltimore playwright C. Richard Gillespie's The Burial. For the duration of the theatre's existence, Corner Theatre had a threefold mission:

 Producing original, otherwise unseen plays;
 Providing local theatre artists with a laboratory environment in which to experiment with unconventional theatrical techniques;
 Occasionally abandoning the idea of presentational theatre altogether in exchange for happenings; at one such event, Changes, audiences were led one at a time through a twenty-minute sojourn into the blacklight world of super-sensory awareness, a late 1960s hall of mirrors and confrontation. 
 

To avoid legal problems which might arise due to the nudity and profanity in many productions, Corner Theatre's charter listed the organization as a club rather than a theatre company.

Encouraged by the high level of interest, both public and press, in the theatre, Corner Theatre presented two new works by an energetic, imaginative local actor, playwright, and teacher, Gordon Porterfield. Porterfield's Authors and The Earth Is Dead were presented as an evening of one-acts under the title Ratsfeet. This initiated a relationship between the playwright and theatre that yielded, over the subsequent seven years, a series of increasingly rich and occasionally profane evenings of locally produced and written theatre.

Subsequent history (1969–1987) and merge with Fells Point Theatre
By the end of 1968, Irons had moved away from Baltimore and Corner Theatre. Baltimore theatre artist Larry Lewman, along with several friends, including Charles Vanderpool, Louis Mills, and Richard Marie, took over the physical operations of Corner Theatre in late 1969 and brought a new level of professionalism to the theatre. Lewman gave an experienced local director, John Bruce Johnson, the role of artistic director. Within months, a newly remodeled Corner Theatre announced Porterfield's new full-length play Universal Nigger, a multi-media presentation depicting an African-American Christ's movements through the stations of the cross. This controversial and highly confrontational show, which attracted the largest audiences the theatre had seen, provided a production model for Corner Theatre for the years to follow. In an article published in The Paper, Bruce Johnson called the production "a sensation," noting that audience demand for the show was so great that even after another production had moved into the theatre's Thursday – Sunday performance slot, Universal Nigger continued playing on Wednesday evenings for two additional months. Later that year, Brooklyn's Chelsea Theater Center acquired the rights to Universal Nigger and produced it in their space for New York audiences, under the direction of Robert Kalfin.

In June 1970, Lewman resigned as managing director and the company moved its operations to 891 North Howard Street, with the premiere of Wallace Hamilton's Tegaroon. Bruce Johnson continued as artistic director and Richard Flax became the new managing director. Megan Terry's political rock musical Viet Rock, under the direction of Michael Makarovich, played to SRO audiences following its inaugural production by the Open Theatre, as performed at La MaMa in New York in 1966. The following year, HERE, an adaptation of Flax's Change, began a successful run. In October 1972, Corner Theatre acquired the rights to London playwright Charles Marowitz's An Othello for its American premiere.

During the Johnson-Flax period, Corner Theatre presented work by talented playwrights, actors, and directors eager to contribute to the new and challenging works being produced at the theatre, including New York playwright Kit Jones' Watchpit, directed by Makarovich. Makarovich also staged two Porterfield one-acts: The Catcher Was A Fag and I And Silence Some Strange Race, as well as an original teleplay called Tigers, among many others. Another work by Porterfield,  was directed by Bruce Johnson, as was Porterfield's subsequent evening of thirteen short one-acts, Gnomes. In January 1972, future Sundance award-winning filmmaker Steve Yeager had his directorial debut with the premiere of Lee Dorsey's Pigeons. In April 1973, Bruce Johnson suffered from a heart attack and was unable to finish directing Porterfield's latest evening of one-acts, Wolves. Director and playwright C. Richard Gillespie took over the production, which received excellent reviews. Hugh M. Jones' Inconnue was a didactic theatrical adaptation of Artaud's The Theatre and its Double, featuring a performance by Judy Rowe and an original musical score by Baltimore composer Chuck Wagner.

By 1974, both Johnson and Flax had left Corner Theatre, and operations were taken over by Foster Grimm, a young local director who had recently staged three one-act plays by New York playwright Robert Karmon under the title Karmon. The theatre's emphasis changed during Grimm's leadership, allowing an increasing number of well-established plays to be presented. The physical facility had many improvements in sound and lighting, and a loose relationship was formed with the theatre department of Towson University, which lasted for several years and created an influx of new talent. Playwrights such as Thomas Thorton, Stanley Keyes, James Secor, and Martha Keltz came to the theatre with works including Gangsters, Oil Rich in Mosby, Psychopathology in Everyday Life – A Family Play, The Exorcism, and Cagliostro. New directors also came to the theatre; Grimm directed a series of Sam Shepard plays, and Brad Mays directed, while still in his late teens, a series of Ionesco one-acts, Brian Friel's Lovers, and John Whiting's The Devils. Mays also appeared as an actor in Porterfield's  Wolves, as well as Porterfield's final Corner Theatre production, Chancre.

Production design at Corner Theatre was best showcased in 1976 with Yeager's staging of C. Richard Gillespie's Marguerite, starring Linda Chambers, James Hild, and Bruce Johnson, and featuring an electronic score by recording artist Vangelis.

In 1987, director Mays and playwright Stanley Keyes, both living in New York, collaborated to create a feature film comedy based on their experiences at Corner Theatre. The film, Stage Fright, had its world premiere at the 1989 Berlin International Film Festival. In 1977, Corner Theatre lost its lease and Grimm resigned as manager. The theatre was then taken over by local director Barry Feinstein and producer/actor Bruce Godfrey, who moved the operation to 100 East Madison Street. The theatre continued at that location, with a less experimental approach, until the company merged with another Baltimore playhouse, the Fells Point Theatre, to form the Fells Point Corner Theatre in 1987. Fells Point Corner Theatre presented Snow, a Porterfield play, under the direction of Lance Lewman in 1999. The play received top honors at the Baltimore Playwright's Festival.

Other programs at the theatre
From its founding, but particularly during Grimm's time as manager, Corner Theatre also offered film screenings, gallery shows, and workshops. Films ranged from Dionysus in '69 and The New York Erotic Film Festival to 16mm films by future underground film legend John Waters, including Multiple Maniacs, Mondo Trasho, and Pink Flamingos. The theatre also held gallery shows by local artists and photographers, and offered its performance space to external theatre groups such as the Baltimore Afro-American Conservatory Theater. Workshops were offered in "human exploration", acting, comedy, directing, and playwriting.

Partial list of plays
Birdbath by Leonard Melfi (first play produced at Corner Theatre)
Blues For Mr. Charlie by James Baldwin
Powah by Robert Behar
Genesis by John A. Butler
Pigeons by Lee Dorsey
Trip Tych by David Epstein
Scars And Tripe by David Epstein
The White Whore and the Bit Player by Tom Eyen
HERE by Dick Flax
The Burial by C. Richard Gillespie
Marguerite by C. Richard Gillespie
John and Marsha Face Life – At The Watergate by Jack Gonzales
Wanting by Wallace Hamilton
Tegaroon by Wallace Hamilton
Rats by Israel Horovitz
The Chrome Tree by Stan Heuisler
Inconnue by Hugh M. Jones
Cagliostro by Martha Keltz
Oil Rich in Mosby by Stanley Keyes
The Exorcism by Stanley Keyes
Chamber Music by Arthur Kopit
Tiger Skin by Joel Levin
An Othello by Charles Marowitz
In Times Like These by Lou Murphy
Generosity by Dennis O'Keefe
Authors by Gordon Porterfield
The Earth Is Dead by Gordon Porterfield
Gnomes by Gordon Porterfield
Universal Nigger by Gordon Porterfield
The Catcher Was A Fag by Gordon Porterfield
I And Silence Some Strange Race by Gordon Porterfield
whatisoneholycatholicapostalicbrownandstinksuptheuniverse by Gordon Porterfield
Wolves by Gordon Porterfield
Dungbeetle by Gordon Porterfield
Dirty Pictures by Gordon Porterfield
Bubble by Gordon Porterfield
Chancre by Gordon Porterfield
Fourteen Hundred by Sam Shepard
Chicago by Sam Shepard
American Polar by Al Spoler
Viet Rock by Megan Terry
Gangsters by Thomas Thorton
Psychopathology in Every Day Life – A Family Play by Thomas Thorton
Chiaroscuro by Steve Yeager
Discoverie
The Final Heir
The Man Who Was Overdue

References

Further reading 

"70's Theatre Scene Finds New Life On Film", Baltimore Morning Sun. July 10, 1987.
"American Independents in Berlin", The Edge: Berlin's Largest English Language Newspaper. Issue 8, February 16 – March 1.

External links 

LaMaMa.org

John Bruce Johnson memorial in Baltimore City Paper

"Commentary: Charles Marowitz" Marowitz's page at Swans.com
Marowitz Theatre Marowitz's official website; includes biography, books, plays, directorial projects, other publications

Brad Mays official website
Gordon Porterfield's 1999 play Snow reviewed by Baltimore City Paper

Steve Yeager on "The Corner Theatre as a Cultural Oasis: Or will Yosemite Sam Find Happiness In The Vast Sahara Desert?"

Former theatres in the United States
Mount Vernon, Baltimore
Theatres in Baltimore